Muga Lal Mahato is a Nepalese politician, belonging to the Madhesi Janadhikar Forum. In April 2008, he won the Sunsari-4 seat in the Constituent Assembly election with 19945 votes.

References

Year of birth missing (living people)
Living people
Madhesi Jana Adhikar Forum, Nepal politicians
Place of birth missing (living people)

Members of the 1st Nepalese Constituent Assembly